James Robert Wallace, Baron Wallace of Tankerness,  (born 25 August 1954) is a Scottish politician serving as a Liberal Democrat life peer in the British House of Lords since 2007 and Moderator of the General Assembly of the Church of Scotland from 2021 to 2022. He served as the Deputy First Minister of Scotland from 1999 to 2005, and during that time he served twice as acting First Minister, in 2000, in the aftermath of Donald Dewar's death and in 2001, following Henry McLeish's resignation. He was formerly Leader of the Scottish Liberal Democrats from 1992 to 2005 and Liberal Democrats in the House of Lords from 2013 to 2016.

Wallace served as a Liberal Democrat Member of Parliament (MP) for Orkney and Shetland from 1983 to 2001 and a Member of the Scottish Parliament (MSP) for Orkney from 1999 to 2007. He also served as Advocate General for Scotland from 2010 to 2015. He was the Moderator of the General Assembly of the Church of Scotland from 1 May 2021 to 23 May 2022.

Early life and education
Wallace was born in Annan in Dumfriesshire, Scotland, and grew up there. He has a brother, Neil. As a boy, his first interest in politics was stoked when he collected autographs from politicians visiting the local area: he still possesses one from Tam Dalyell, with whom he later served in the House of Commons.

Wallace was educated at Annan Academy, a state secondary school in his hometown of Annan. Following school, he was accepted by Downing College, Cambridge, where he obtained a joint BA degree in economics and law. From there he returned to Scotland to study law at the University of Edinburgh, graduating with an LLB degree in 1977. Based in Edinburgh, he practised as an advocate at the Scottish Bar, mostly in civil law cases.

Political career

Member of Parliament (UK)
Wallace joined the then-Liberal Party in the early 1970s, but did not become very active in it until after completing his second degree. His first foray as a parliamentary candidate was in the constituency of Dumfriesshire in 1979, where he failed to win. He also stood, unsuccessfully, as the Liberal candidate in the South of Scotland constituency at the European Parliament elections of that year.

Four years later, he would earn the Liberal nomination for the seat of Orkney and Shetland, the seat being vacated by former party leader Jo Grimond, and won election to the Parliament. At the time, it was extremely rare for Liberal candidates to successfully win elections to succeed former Liberal MPs, although many have since done so. He was to serve as the MP there for 18 years, occupying a number of front bench posts for the Liberal Party (and, from 1988 onwards, the Liberal Democrats), including Employment spokesman and Chief Whip.

In 1992, he was unopposed in becoming the new leader of the Scottish Liberal Democrats, succeeding Malcolm Bruce. Scottish politics at this time was dominated by the question of constitutional reform. There were few opportunities for legislation affecting Scots Law to be debated or effectively scrutinised at Westminster and, especially after the 1987 Election, with only ten Conservative MPs in Scotland but with a large majority in the House of Commons, it was argued that there was a democratic deficit in Scotland.

He led the Scottish Liberal Democrats in the first election to the new Scottish Parliament in 1999, himself winning the constituency of Orkney with 67% of the votes cast. This meant he served as a Member of both the Scottish and Westminster Parliaments for a time with a dual mandate, although like other MPs elected to Holyrood (such as John Swinney, John Home Robertson and Donald Gorrie) he stood down from Westminster at the 2001 General Election.

Member of the Scottish Parliament
As expected, the proportional election system for the new Scottish Parliament meant that Labour failed to gain an outright majority in the first elections. Their leader, Donald Dewar, chose to seek a formal coalition government with a working majority rather than try to operate as a minority government.

Deputy First Minister
He contacted Wallace and a week of formal negotiations were held between the two parties' representatives, following which a partnership agreement was signed, committing both parties to support a negotiated joint agenda. Wallace became Deputy First Minister and Minister for Justice, and maintained these briefs throughout the first term of the Parliament.

The decision to enter a coalition government with Labour was controversial at the time. British politicians were unaccustomed to coalition politics, and the Liberal Democrats came under fire from Conservative and SNP opponents who claimed they had 'sold out' their principles. Key to this criticism was the Labour policy of making students pay tuition fees, which the Liberal Democrats had promised to abolish as their price of entering a coalition, but which became merely the subject of an inquiry as the coalition was formed.

In the event, the Liberal Democrats did insist on the abolition of tuition fees after the inquiry reported in 2001, but in 1999, the delay was perceived to have been a compromise, and Wallace in particular became the focal point for extremely bitter criticism. Despite this, and other difficult moments, he and his party stayed firm and remained in power. Wallace established himself as a minister.

Acting First Minister
On three occasions over the first term of the Parliament, he became Acting First Minister: twice in 2000 due to at first the illness, and later the death, of the first First Minister Donald Dewar, and then again in 2001, after the resignation of Dewar's successor as First Minister, Henry McLeish. Each occasion lasted for only a few weeks.

Under his continued leadership, the Scottish Liberal Democrats' popularity grew steadily. After leading the party through the second Holyrood elections in 2003 Elections, again winning 17 MSPs but with a higher share of the vote, he led the party into a second coalition with Labour. The 2003 coalition negotiation process was widely seen as a more successful enterprise by the Liberal Democrats than the preceding one, with key aspects of Labour's proposals on anti-social behaviour dropped or limited, and with the promise of proportional representation for Scotland's 32 local councils.

Wallace remained as Deputy First Minister, but left the Justice brief, becoming instead the Minister for Enterprise and Lifelong Learning.

Resignation and peerage
On 9 May 2005, following the 2005 General Election, Wallace announced his intention to stand down as party leader and Deputy First Minister. He would remain as MSP for Orkney until the 2007 election, but would serve his time out as a backbencher. He ceased to be an MSP with the dissolution of the Scottish Parliament on 2 April 2007.

On 13 September 2007, it was announced that he was to be appointed to the House of Lords. He was subsequently created a life peer on 17 October 2007 taking the title Baron Wallace of Tankerness, of Tankerness in Orkney. Wallace also received an Honorary Doctorate from Heriot-Watt University in 2007 

On 28 April 2008, it was announced that the new Lord Wallace would be a member of the Commission on Scottish Devolution, chaired by Sir Kenneth Calman, established by the Scottish Parliament to consider the future powers of the Parliament, including powers over finance. This is a distinct exercise from the SNP Government's national conversation.

In November 2008, Wallace received a lifetime achievement award in the Scottish Politician of the Year Awards.

In May 2010, he was appointed Advocate General for Scotland, one of the Law Officers of the Crown, who advise the government on Scots law.

He was elected unopposed, as the leader of the Liberal Democrats in the House of Lords on 15 October 2013, replacing Lord McNally, who had stepped down earlier in the month.

In September 2016, he stepped down as the Leader of the Liberal Democrat in the House of Lords, citing a desire to step back from "frontline" politics stating "I was first elected to the House of Commons 33 years ago. For 28 of these years, I have been on the frontline, including sixteen years in a leadership role, here in the Lords and in Scotland."

Honours and awards 
In 2018 he was elected a Fellow of the Royal Society of Edinburgh.

Moderator of the General Assembly of the Church of Scotland 
A longstanding Elder of the Church of Scotland at St. Magnus Cathedral, Kirkwall, he was nominated and appointed to be Moderator of the General Assembly of the Church of Scotland for 2021–2022. It is highly unusual for a lay person to be nominated as Moderator, predecessors being Alison Elliot in 2004 and George Buchanan in 1567.

Personal life
Wallace married Rosemary (née Fraser) a speech therapist in 1983, who he calls "Rosie". The couple has two daughters: Helen and Clare. He has two sons-in-law, Andrew and James, and two granddaughters, Catriona and Ella.
Wallace is an elder of the Church of Scotland, attending St Magnus Cathedral in Kirkwall, Orkney.

See also
List of Scottish Executive Ministerial Teams

References

External links 
 
 
 
The Constant Face of Devolution BBC profile, 9 May 2005

|-

|-

|-

|-

|-

|-

|-

|-

|-

|-

|-

|-

1954 births
Advocates General for Scotland
Alumni of Downing College, Cambridge
Alumni of the University of Edinburgh School of Law
Elders of the Church of Scotland
Deputy First Ministers of Scotland
Justice ministers of Scotland
Leaders of the Scottish Liberal Democrats
Liberal Democrats (UK) life peers
Liberal Democrat MSPs
Scottish Liberal Party MPs
Living people
Members of the Parliament of the United Kingdom for Orkney and Shetland
Members of the Privy Council of the United Kingdom
Members of the Scottish Parliament 1999–2003
Members of the Scottish Parliament 2003–2007
Ordained peers
People educated at Annan Academy
People from Annan, Dumfries and Galloway
Scottish Liberal Democrat MPs
Scottish King's Counsel
UK MPs 1983–1987
UK MPs 1987–1992
UK MPs 1992–1997
UK MPs 1997–2001
People associated with Orkney
Fellows of the Royal Society of Edinburgh
Life peers created by Elizabeth II